Pardosa ramulosa is a species of wolf spider in the family Lycosidae. It is found in the United States and Mexico. The spider feeds primarily on prey near salt marsh habitat, and requires a varied diet.

References

ramulosa
Articles created by Qbugbot
Spiders described in 1894